Savage Moon is a PlayStation 3 and PSP tower defense strategy game by British studio FluffyLogic which sees the player protecting a remote, off-world mining facility from constant attack by Insectocytes, a type of carnivorous creature inhabiting the planets. The mission is to strategically place an array of upgradeable, defensive weapons in the way of the bugs. There is a range of towers, from rapid-fire machine guns to support towers such as the chaos tower.

The game was released for download on the European PlayStation Network on 24 December 2008 and in North America on 29 January 2009.

In 2010 the soundtrack to the DLC of Savage Moon: Waldgeist - also composed by Elsaesser, was nominated for Best Original Video Game Score in the 55th Ivor Novello Awards. This was the first year that music from games was given a category in the awards.

On 22 December 2009 a new game set in the same universe and featuring some of the same units and towers was released, titled The Hera Campaign.

References

 http://www.metacritic.com/game/playstation-3/savage-moon/critic-reviews

External links
FluffyLogic

2008 video games
PlayStation 3-only games
PlayStation Network games
Tower defense video games
PlayStation 3 games
Sony Interactive Entertainment games
Video games about insects
Video games developed in the United Kingdom
Video games set on fictional planets
PhyreEngine games
Strategy video games
Single-player video games

ca:Categoria:Videojocs exclusius per PlayStation 3